Neville Tuli (born 24 April 1964) is the Founder Chairman of the "Osian’s" Group of companies. The Group includes the Parent Company, "Osian’s Connoisseurs of Art Pvt. Ltd." (Estd. 2000, closed in 2010) and its two Subsidiary Companies, being "Osian’s Cinematic Pvt. Ltd." (Estd. 2007) and "Osianama Learning Experience Pvt. Ltd." (Estd. 2009).

Initial endeavours and Osian art fund
Also see Osian art fund scam

Little is known of Tuli's background except for what he claimed in interviews. He was born in India and subsequently underwent graduation from LSE in London. Thereafter, in interviews, he admitted to having learnt little in college and more at Ladbrokes where he gambled on horses, and also learnt more of the operations of binary networking and MLM schemes. Tuli returned to India in 1993 and found an opportunity to cash in on the yet unexplored Indian art market.

In 1996, Tuli established a trust called "HEART" (The Tuli Foundation for Holistic Education & Art) as a trust that would serve as an umbrella for the shell companies that he subsequently created for people to invest in art, Its stated aim was "to help build a quality-conscious infrastructure for the Indian fine arts". In 1997 he wrote a book The Flamed Mosaic: Indian Contemporary Painting, on the aesthetics and history of Indian Modern & Contemporary Painting. In the same year, he helped organise an arts festival in Mumbai called "The Intuitive-logic: A Festival of Indian Contemporary Painting" mostly using donations from wealthy patrons and the existing funds of his Heart trust.

Seeing a need and an opportunity in the recently opened up wealthy Indian upper class,  Tuli began to create an art auction house and in October 1997, held the first large scale an art auction in India under the banner of "The Intuitive-logic II". The auction established record prices for many artists including Raja Ravi Varma whose painting fetched Rs. 32 lacs, the highest price ever for a modern Indian painting. The catalogue published by them also set new standards for prices of art, documentation and design. Thus Osian's began to hold regular art auctions since 2000 as well as playing a role in deciding the prices for works of art, often through Tuli's own books and catalogues. Osian's has held over 40 Auctions during the past two decades.

It also began an "International quality Auctions and Art Advisory Services" in 2001 to generate the finance to support Osian’s work. this subsequently morphed into one of the many shell companies operating under the Osian group's banner.  
In 2002, a sensational new market and awareness for the popular arts, especially film memorabilia was created when it was placed on the same platform as Indian contemporary arts with the auction – A Historical Mela: The ABC of India. Subsequently, Neville Tuli acquired Cinefan [The Festival of Asian & Arab Cinema] and Cinemaya, the world’s first journal exclusively dedicated to Asian Cinema, in 2004, to broaden its cinema-infrastructure base and to complement its vast cinema archives. The Osian’s Cinefan Film Festival of Indian, Asian & Arab Cinema held in New Delhi now features on the International Film Festivals Calendar.

In a bid to gain publicity, Osian’s collaborated with the football tournament Durand Cup in 2007. In 2008, the SEBI commenced litigation against osian due to its not having filed any papers for the art fund (Osian countered that their art fund did not fall under SEC's purview). In 2011, as investors from India and Dubai realized that they would not get their promised returns and were in danger of losing their principal, they started to file suits against Osian's art fund in Mumbai and in London.

Post Osian art fund
As the art fund continued to come across financial difficulties and litigations due to an inability to give its investors the promised returns, Tuli moved over to other means. In 2013, he organized an auction of sports memorabilia, mostly related to cricket in Mumbai.

In 2013 Tuli and Osian’s launched a website called osianama.com, containing information on Indian art along with a special search engine meant for Indian art. In 2014, he organized an exhibition and auction of artworks of Indian & Asian arts, antiquities, books, prints, photographs and film memorabilia, which had been inspired by animals.

As of 2017, Osian's continues to function through its New Delhi office.

References

Bibliography
1997, The Flamed Mosaic: Indian Contemporary Painting, Tuli, Neville, HEART & Mapin Publishing Pvt. Ltd.,    
1997, The Intuitive-Logic II: Modern & Contemporary Indian Paintings, Drawings, Graphics, Sculpture & Tapestry, HEART.,  
1999, HEART: Intuitive Logic – The Next Step, HEART., 
2001, India: The Passionate Detachment, Osian’s Connoisseurs of Art Pvt. Ltd., 
2001, India: Historical Lila, Mumbai, Osian’s Connoisseurs of Art Pvt. Ltd., 
2002, A Historical Mela: The ABC of India The Art, Book & Cinema, Osian’s Connoisseurs of Art Pvt. Ltd., 
2002, A Historical Epic: India in the Making 1757–1950 From Surrender to Revolt, Swaraj to Responsibility, Osian’s Connoisseurs of Art Pvt. Ltd., 
2002, MMQ & Indian Modern & Contemporary Paintings, Osian’s Connoisseurs of Art Pvt. Ltd., 
2003, Forty Masterpieces 20th Century Painting & Drawing From India, Pakistan, Bangladesh & Sri Lanka, Mumbai, sian’s Connoisseurs of Art Pvt. Ltd., 
2003, FN-FN Figurative Non-Figurative Narration, Osian’s Connoisseurs of Art Pvt. Ltd., 
2004, Masterpieces & Museum-Quality III Indian Contemporary Paintings with Rare Books & Vintage Cinema Memorabilia, Osian’s Connoisseurs of Art Pvt. Ltd., 
2004, The Masterpieces & Museum Quality Series IV Indian Contemporary Art Paintings and Sculpture, Osian’s Connoisseurs of Art Pvt. Ltd., 
2005, Indian Contemporary  Art Painting, Drawing & Sculpture, Osian’s Connoisseurs of Art Pvt. Ltd., 
2005, Film Memorabilia & The Fine-Popular Cultures of India, Osian’s Connoisseurs of Art Pvt. Ltd., 
2005, Masterpieces & Museum Quality Series V: Indian Contemporary Paintings, Osian’s Connoisseurs of Art Pvt. Ltd., 
2006, Masterpieces & Museum Quality Series VI, Osian’s Connoisseurs of Art Pvt. Ltd., 
2006, The ABC Series Art, Book & Cinema, Osian’s Connoisseurs of Art Pvt. Ltd., 
2006, Forty Masterpieces Museum Quality Series VII, Osian’s Connoisseurs of Art Pvt. Ltd., 
2007, Museum Quality Series VIII, Osian’s Connoisseurs of Art Pvt. Ltd., 
2007, ABC Series III Art, Book & Cinema, Osian’s Connoisseurs of Art Pvt. Ltd., 
2007, The Masterpieces & ABC Series, Osian’s Connoisseurs of Art Pvt. Ltd., 
2007, The Masters Series, Osian’s Connoisseurs of Art Pvt. Ltd., 
2008, Indian Modern & Contemporary Art, Osian’s Connoisseurs of Art Pvt. Ltd., 
2008, Indian Modern & Contemporary Art, Osian’s Connoisseurs of Art Pvt. Ltd., 
2008, The ABC Series, Osian’s Connoisseurs of Art Pvt. Ltd., 
2008, Indian Modern & Contemporary Art & Craft, Osian’s Connoisseurs of Art Pvt. Ltd., 
2009, ABC Series Auction, Osian’s Connoisseurs of Art Pvt. Ltd., 
2009, Indian Modern & Contemporary Art, Osian’s Connoisseurs of Art Pvt. Ltd., 
2009, Indian Modern & Contemporary Art & Craft, Osian’s Connoisseurs of Art Pvt. Ltd., 
2009, Select Masterpieces of Indian Modern & Contemporary Art, Osian’s Connoisseurs of Art Pvt. Ltd., 
2009, Indian & Asian Antiquities & Modern Arts, Osian’s Connoisseurs of Art Pvt. Ltd., 
2010, The Masterpieces Series, Osian’s Connoisseurs of Art Pvt. Ltd., 
2010, 101 Rare Artworks from the History of Indian Modern & Contemporary Art, Osian’s Connoisseurs of Art Pvt. Ltd., 
2011, Creative India Series 1: Bengal, Osian’s Connoisseurs of Art Pvt. Ltd., 
2012, Creative India Series 2: Punjab & Delhi, Osian’s Connoisseurs of Art Pvt. Ltd., 
2012, Creative India Series 3: Bombay & Baroda, Osian’s Connoisseurs of Art Pvt. Ltd., 
2012, Creative India Series 4: Goa, Cholamandal & South India, Osian’s Connoisseurs of Art Pvt. Ltd., 
2012, Osians -Cinefan Auction of Indian Film Memorabilia, Osian’s Connoisseurs of Art Pvt. Ltd., 
2013, The Osianama Series: Antq. Arts. Cine. Photo. Prnt, Osian’s Connoisseurs of Art Pvt. Ltd., 
2013, Forty Masterpieces Indian Miniatures & Modern Art, Osian’s Connoisseurs of Art Pvt. Ltd., 
2013, Dare to Care: A Charity Fundraising Auction for UNICEF, Osian’s Connoisseurs of Art Pvt. Ltd., 
2013, Osian's India's Glorious Cricketing Heritage, Osian’s Connoisseurs of Art Pvt. Ltd., 
2014, Icons: 2nd Cricket Heritage Auction, Osian's Connoisseurs of Art Pvt. Ltd., 
2014, 2nd Osianama Series, Osian's Connoisseurs of Art Pvt. Ltd., 
2014, The Greatest Indian Show on Earth, Osian's Connoisseurs of Art Pvt. Ltd., 
2014, All Creatures Great & Small, Osian's Connoisseurs of Art Pvt. Ltd.,

Exhibitions curated by Neville Tuli
1997, Intuitive Logic:  A Festival of Indian Modern & Contemporary Painting, Mumbai.
2004, The Underlying Spirit, New Delhi.
2005, Revisualising India, New Delhi.
2006, The Osian Asian, New Delhi.
2007, An Historical Epic (exhibition in three parts), New Delhi.
2008, The Osian Asian II, New Delhi.
2011, Indian Contemporary Art: The Intuitive – Logic Revisited From the Osian's Collection at the World Economic Forum, Davos, Switzerland.

1964 births
Living people
British auctioneers
British non-fiction writers
British male writers
Male non-fiction writers